The East Metropolitan Province was a two-member electoral province of the Western Australian Legislative Council, located in metropolitan Perth. It was created by a redistribution in 1976, and took effect on 22 May 1977 following the 1977 state election. It was formed from parts of the North-East Metropolitan and South-East Metropolitan provinces, and was a safe Labor seat.

The province had two concurrent members during its brief history — Bob Hetherington and Fred McKenzie, both of the Labor Party. The 1982 redistribution increased the number of metropolitan provinces from 6 to 7 (as against 10 in the rural and peri-urban areas), but abolished the East Metropolitan Province. Its members won election in neighbouring provinces at the 1983 election.

The province was made up of four complete Legislative Assembly districts — those of Ascot, Canning, Victoria Park and Welshpool.

Geography
The province was made up of several complete Legislative Assembly districts, which changed at each distribution.

Representation

Members

References
 
 

Former electoral provinces of Western Australia